Cocoa Sugar is the third studio album by Scottish indie group Young Fathers. It was released on Ninja Tune on 9 March 2018. It won the Scottish Album of the Year Award for 2018. It peaked at number 28 on the UK Albums Chart.

Artwork
The album art, designed by Tom Hingston and photographed by Julia Noni, features band member Alloysious Massaquoi and is a direct homage to the Waldemar Swierzy's Polish poster for the 1969 drama film Midnight Cowboy.

Critical reception

At Metacritic, which assigns a weighted average score out of 100 to reviews from mainstream critics, the album received an average score of 87, based on 21 reviews, indicating "universal acclaim".

Clayton Purdom of The A.V. Club described the album as "a worthy progression, a tight stretch of otherworldly melodies, ramshackle percussion, and buzzing clouds of woozy ambient sound."

Accolades

Track listing

Personnel
 David Cousin – additional vocals (track 12)
 Timothy London – co-producer
 Graham "G" Hastings – mixing (tracks 1–4, 6–12)
 Laurie Ross – mixing (tracks 1–4, 6–12)
 Ben Baptie – mixing (track 5)
 Vlado Meller – mastering
 Hingston Studio – design and art direction
 Julia Noni – photography

Charts

References

External links
 

2018 albums
Ninja Tune albums
Young Fathers albums
Scottish Album of the Year Award winners